Johnnie Lee Gray (born December 18, 1953) is an American former professional football player. Gray was a safety in the  National Football League (NFL) with the Green Bay Packers.

Early life and career
Gray was born in Lake Charles, Louisiana and graduated from Lompoc High School in Lompoc, California. He played college football at Allan Hancock College and California State University, Fullerton.

He was an undrafted rookie with the Green Bay Packers in the 1975 NFL season and played for the team for nine seasons. Gray was inducted into the Green Bay Packers Hall of Fame in 1993. After retiring as a player, Gray was a football analyst for a FOX affiliate. He is now a uniform inspector for the National Football League.
He also co-hosts Pack Attack TV program on central Wisconsin's local ABC WAOW.

References

External links
 Pro-Football-Reference.com
 databaseFootball.com

1953 births
Living people
People from Lompoc, California
Sportspeople from Lake Charles, Louisiana
Sportspeople from Santa Barbara County, California
American football safeties
Cal State Fullerton Titans football players
California State University, Fullerton alumni
Allan Hancock Bulldogs football players
Green Bay Packers players
African-American players of American football
Players of American football from California
21st-century African-American people
20th-century African-American sportspeople